Wyandot may refer to:

Native American ethnography 
 Wyandot people, also known as the Huron
 Wyandot language
 Wyandot religion

Places 
 Wyandot, Ohio, an unincorporated community
 Wyandot County, Ohio
 Camp Wyandot, a Camp Fire Boys and Girls camp in Hocking Hills, Ohio
 Wyandot Point, a rock point west-southwest of Cape Tennyson on the north side of Ross Island in Antarctica
 Wyandot Ridge, a rocky ridge at the west side of Chattahoochee Glacier in Antarctica

Other uses 
 USS Wyandot (AKA-92)
 Wyandot Snacks, a snack food manufacturer based in Marion, Ohio
 Wyandotte chicken

See also 

 
 
 Wyandotte (disambiguation)
 Wendat (disambiguation)
 Huron-Wendat (disambiguation)
 Huron-Wendat Nation, a First Nation whose community and reserve is at Wendake, Quebec
 Huron (disambiguation)

Language and nationality disambiguation pages